The Journal of Music Theory Pedagogy is an annual peer-reviewed academic journal covering the teaching and pedagogy of music theory and analysis. It was established in 1987 and is published under the auspices of The Gail Boyd de Stwolinski Center for Music Theory Pedagogy at the University of Oklahoma.

The journal's founding editors-in-chief were James H. Faulconer, Alice M. Lanning, and Michael R. Rogers. Steven G. Laitz (Juilliard School) is the Executive Editor.

In 2010, a year before the journal's 25th anniversary, the editors secured funding for a website, Music Theory Pedagogy Online. In 2013, the editors began publishing an online-only e-journal through the website, which provides resources for theory teachers. As of 2014, the e-journal has published over a dozen articles, including videos, apps, and other multimedia that cannot be included in the journal's main paper publication.

References

External links 
 
 

Music education journals
Publications established in 1987
Annual journals
English-language journals
University of Oklahoma
Academic journals published by universities and colleges of the United States